SpliceInfo is a database for the four major alternative-splicing modes (exon skipping, 5'-alternative splicing, 3'-alternative splicing and intron retention) in the human genome.

See also
 Alternative splicing
 EDAS
 AspicDB
 Hollywood (database)

References

External links
 http://SpliceInfo.mbc.NCTU.edu.tw/

Genetics databases
Gene expression
RNA splicing
Spliceosome